The 2019 South Oxfordshire District Council election took place on 2 May 2019 to elect members of South Oxfordshire District Council in Oxfordshire, England. The whole council was up for election. The Conservatives lost control of the council.

Summary

Election result

|-

Results by Ward

Benson & Crowmarsh

Berinsfield

Chalgrove

Chinnor

Cholsey

Didcot North East

Didcot South

Didcot West

Forest Hill & Holton

Garsington & Horspath

Goring

Haseley Brook

Henley-on-Thames

Kidmore End & Whitchurch

Sandford & the Wittenhams

Sonning Common

Thame

Wallingford

Watlington

Wheatley

Woodcote & Rotherfield

By-elections

Didcot North East

Forest Hill and Holton

References 

South Oxfordshire District Council elections
2019 English local elections
2010s in Oxfordshire
May 2019 events in the United Kingdom